Rocky Mountain High School is a four-year public secondary school in Meridian, Idaho, west of Boise. Opened in the fall of 2008, it is the fifth major high school in the West Ada School District. As of 2015, Rocky Mountain has had the largest enrollment in the state, beating out neighboring rival Mountain View. The school colors are purple, black and silver and the mascot is a Grizzly bear.

Demographics
The demographic breakdown of the 2,455 students enrolled in 2020-2021 was:
Male - 51.4%
Female - 48.6%
Native American/Alaskan - 0.2%
Native Hawaiian/Pacific islanders - 0.5%
Asian - 2.0%
Black - 0.9%
Hispanic - 8.8%
White - 84.0%
Two or More Races - 3.6%

14.1% of students were eligible for free or reduced lunch.

Athletics
IHSAA Class 5A, District IIISouthern Idaho Conference (5A) (SIC)

State titles
Boys
 Soccer (1): 2018
 Football (3): 2015, 2018, 2020
 Basketball (2): 2017, 2018
 Cross Country (6): 2012, 2016, 2017, 2018, 2021, 2022
 Baseball (2): 2012, 2017 
 Tennis: 2022
 Track (9): 2011, 2012, 2013, 2014, 2016, 2017, 2018, 2019, 2021 
 Hockey (3): 2017, 2018, 2019

Girls
 Soccer (3): 2011, 2018, 2019 
 Volleyball (1): 2010

References

External links 
 
 West Ada School District

Schools in Ada County, Idaho
Meridian, Idaho
Public high schools in Idaho
2008 establishments in Idaho
Educational institutions established in 2008
West Ada School District (Idaho)